Wetterhorn Peak (literally Weather Horn) is a fourteen thousand foot mountain peak in the U.S. state of Colorado.

Wetterhorn Peak, and its neighbor Matterhorn Peak, are named after the Wetterhorn and the Matterhorn, two famous peaks in the Swiss Alps. Both Colorado peaks are pointed rock spires (hence resembling their namesake peaks), whose shapes contrast with the broad bulk of the higher Uncompahgre Peak.

The first recorded ascent of the peak was made in 1906 by George Barnard, C. Smedley, W. P. Smedley, and D. Utter, but a previous ascent by miners working in the area in the 19th century is likely.

The standard, and only common, route on Wetterhorn Peak is the southeast ridge, which is accessed via the Matterhorn Creek drainage on the south side of the mountain. The trailhead is on the Henson Creek Road, accessible from Lake City. The route involves  of ascent from the trailhead and some exposed scrambling (Class 3/4) on the ridge itself. The nearby east face is considered a high-quality advanced snow climb or extreme ski descent.

See also

List of mountain peaks of Colorado
List of Colorado fourteeners

References

External links

 
Wetterhorn Peak on Distantpeak.com

Mountains of Hinsdale County, Colorado
Mountains of Ouray County, Colorado
Fourteeners of Colorado
North American 4000 m summits
San Juan Mountains (Colorado)
Uncompahgre National Forest
Mountains of Colorado